Harold Alexander De Barbizon Sloan (25 August 1882 – 21 January 1917) was an Irish soccer player at the beginning of the 20th century.

Sloan represented Bohemians during his career in the Irish League. A forward, he was one of the main stars in the early Bohemian history. He scored the very first goal ever at Dalymount Park in a 4–2 win over Shelbourne on 7 September 1901.

He won 8 full international caps for Ireland and once scored a hat-trick for them against Wales in a 4–4 draw in April 1906.

Sloan served as a second lieutenant in the Royal Garrison Artillery in the British Army and was killed in action during World War I on 21 January 1917. He is buried at the Guards Cemetery at Combles.

Honours
Leinster League
 Bohemians - 1899/1900, 1900/01, 1901/02
8 Full International Caps

References

1882 births
1917 deaths
Association footballers from County Dublin
Irish association footballers (before 1923)
Pre-1950 IFA international footballers
Bohemian F.C. players
Royal Garrison Artillery officers
British Army personnel of World War I
British military personnel killed in World War I
Leinster Senior League (association football) players
Association footballers not categorized by position